Kirpal "Paul" Nandra is a British physicist and the current director at the Max Planck Institute for Extraterrestrial Physics.

He was Professor of Astrophysics and Head of the Astrophysics Group at Imperial College London.

He is noted as a member of the X-ray group and studies the astrophysics of extreme environments, specifically those close to black holes in active galactic nuclei. He has written or co-written numerous papers on this topic.

Awards
 2000 Newton Lacy Pierce Prize in Astronomy for his work.

References

External links
"Kirpal Nandra", Scientific Commons
 Profile of Nandra at NASA

Academics of Imperial College London
British expatriates in Germany
British physicists
Living people
Year of birth missing (living people)
Max Planck Institute directors